Arter is a contemporary art museum in the Dolapdere district of Istanbul, Turkey.

A subsidiary of the Vehbi Koç Foundation, Arter was opened in 2010 with the aim of providing a sustainable infrastructure for producing and exhibiting contemporary art. Following eight years of operation during which it contributed to the visibility of contemporary art with a programme featuring exhibitions, publications, talks, performances and workshops at its venue on Istiklal Street, Arter moved to its new home in the Dolapdere district of Istanbul in September 2019. At its new building, Arter continues expanding the range of its activities beyond exhibitions to performances and events across many disciplines.

Arter presented 63 exhibitions and provided support for the production of over 240 artworks between May 2010 and March 2023.

Building

Arter was active at the historical building known as Meymenet Han on Istanbul's Istiklal Street between 2010 and 2018. In September 2019, Arter moved to its new premises in Dolapdere. Designed by Grimshaw Architects, London, Arter's new building has 18,000 square metres of indoor area; in addition to exhibition galleries, the building features performance halls, learning areas, a library, an arts bookstore, and a bistro.

Arter's former building on Istiklal Street re-opened in September 2019 as an exhibition space named Meşher, operated by the Vehbi Koç Foundation.

Architectural Design 
For the architectural design of Arter's new building in Dolapdere, a project competition was initiated in 2013. The winners of this competition were Grimshaw Architects who took the lead in the design process with contributions by Thornton Tomasetti, Max Fordham, and Neill Woodger Acoustics in their respective areas of expertise. The construction of the building was started in 2015 and completed in 2019.

Galleries and Other Spaces 
Arter's main function areas are connected by a central atrium that serves as the heart of the building, which has an indoor area of 18,000 square metres. The six galleries and a terrace constitute approximately 5,000 square metres of dedicated exhibition areas spread on six floors.

Performance Halls

Arter's building features two performance halls: Karbon, a full-fledged “Blackbox” performance and exhibition space; and Sevgi Gönül Auditorium, which is the principal venue for Arter's film programme, conferences, and panels, as well as chamber concerts and examples of performing arts including dance and movement. Both halls offer flexible, multiple seating configurations with a flat-floor option, thus providing a facility for large-scale installations or projects that require multi-channel panoramic projection.

Studio

Designed as the main space of the learning programme, the studio consists of four units catering to different areas of use. The studio provides a flexible space for all kinds of events such as meetings, talks, and workshops. The hands-on production area also constitutes a facility for artists and visitors to produce their own works at Arter.

Arter Library

Arter Library provides free access to publications related to Arter's current exhibitions and events programme, reference books on art, magazines, as well as electronic databases. The users may browse the online library catalogue on Arter's website.

Arter Bookstore

Open during Arter's visiting hours, Arter Bookstore features a selection of publications focusing on art, social sciences, non-fiction and children's books. This multi-disciplinary selection is regularly updated in line with Arter's current exhibitions and events programmes.

Bistro by Divan

A subsidiary of Divan Group, Bistro by Divan hosts Arter's visitors with its specially designed menu during the visiting hours.

History

Istiklal Street, Beyoğlu

Between 2010 and 2018, Arter has presented 26 solo and 9 group exhibitions at Meymenet Han on Istiklal Street.

Arter's inaugural exhibition Starter (8 May–31 January 2010) presented more than 160 works by 87 artists, all belonging to the Arter Collection.

In line with its mission to support artistic production, Arter has encouraged and funded the creation of new works for each exhibition.

Furthermore, Arter hosted the Istanbul Biennial as one of the main venues for its 13th and 14th editions as well as the 4th edition of the Istanbul Design Biennial.

Dolapdere, Beyoğlu

At its new building in Dolapdere, opened on 9 September 2019, Arter presented an inaugural programme of seven exhibitions, four of them drawn from its collection. The institution also offered further possibilities to discover, enjoy and engage in a closer dialogue with art: performances, concerts, a festival dedicated to new music, talks, workshops and interpretation events along with two new publication series.

A new three-day festival was introduced by Arter to the music scene of Istanbul in February 2020. The first edition of the New and Newest Music Festival offered a programme that included five live concerts. The second edition of the festival in February 2021 was held online in the wake of restrictions due to the COVID-19 pandemic; it offered a programme of panels, film screenings, and workshops. The third edition, also held online in February 2022, explored the concepts of diversity, accessibility and transitivity.

Arter also featured a special programme dedicated to performance art during its 2019–2020 season. The programme was devised in three interrelated and consecutive sections, namely, “Celebration”, “Participation”, and “Resonance”.

In 2020, the COVID-19 pandemic forced Arter to halt its activities temporarily, from 14 March to 16 June. During the worldwide lockdown, Arter continued its programme on digital platforms featuring a selection of video works entitled #playathome as well as events and an exhibition of more than 160 works from its collection via Google Arts & Culture.

In October 2021, Arter hosted a series of events organised and financed by the Goethe-Institut and the Südwestrundfunk (SWR) under the title “From the River Danube to the Bosphorus: Donaueschingen Music Days”. Sevgi Gönül Auditorium and Arter's backyard also welcomed visitors for film screenings, concerts, and panel discussions organised as part of the 14th Documentarist Istanbul Documentary Days, the 49th Istanbul Music Festival, and the 25th Istanbul Theatre Festival in 2021.

In May 2022, Arter's Sevgi Gönül Auditorium hosted 26 artists, 12 initiatives and 15 art institutions in the context of Border_less Artbook Days. Arter also became one of the major venues for the performances and events held in June 2022 as part of the Istanbul International Improvisation Dance Festival and hosted Tonedmelisma Music Festival themed Mind and Mistic: The Heart in September 2022.

In August 2022, Arter Children's Festival was held for the first time with the title Come Out Art, Whenever You Are.

In October 2022, the event titled “Noble & Sentimental” brought Bösendorfer artist Emre Yavuz with Andante Classical Music Magazine Editor-in-Chief and music writer Serhan Bali together for a special occasion featuring a concert and a conversation which took place at Arter’s Sevgi Gönül Auditorium. Arter’s Karbon hosted Neue Klangkunst – a musical collaboration between Stefan Winter and Mariko Takahashi – for a performance titled “The Ninth Wave – Ode to Nature” on 15 and 16 December 2022, and Jerfi Aji for a concert organised to mark the launch of his album “Alexander Scriabin: Poems, Colours, Flames” on 22 December 2022.

In January 2023, Arter’s programme featured two special events – “Good-Bye Paradise?” (Gerhard Stäbler & Kunsu Shim) and “Hush, Little Baby” (Önder Baloğlu & Çağdaş Özkan) – inspired by the group exhibitions ThisPlay and Rounded by Sleep.

Arter Collection 
Instigated in 2007 and conceived on an international basis, the Arter Collection aims to collect and care for contemporary works of art, engaging in their creative interpretation through exhibitions as well as encouraging and funding the production of new ones.

The Arter Collection comprises more than 1.400 works by around 400 artists as of 2020 and it brings together various contemporary expressions, positions and practices from all around the world. The collection includes works from the 1960s to the present covering a broad variety of media ranging from painting, drawing, sculpture, print, photography, film, video, installation to sound, light and performance-based practices.

Events Programme 
Arter presents a multi-disciplinary events programme featuring examples of performing arts, classical, contemporary and electronic music, film, performance and digital arts. The events are not limited to Arter's two performance halls, the Sevgi Gönül Auditorium and Karbon, but are also held in different parts and spaces of the building.

Learning Programme 
Arter's Learning Programme presents processes and activities that aspire to interpreting our times through art. Shaped through a receptive and responsive attitude towards users’ affinities, the programme intends to build lasting connections between artists, audiences and partners. Besides talks, panels, workshops, seminars and exhibition tours, Arter's Learning Programme also features two long-term programmes: Teen Council and Arter Research Programme.

Publications

Arter's programme features bilingual publications that accompany each exhibition. Between May 2010 and June 2022, Arter published 76 books with an aim to enhance conversations around contemporary art by encouraging original research and commissioning new texts.

Arter's range of publications has been expanded in 2019 to include two new series: the first is entitled “Arter Close-Up” and offers a closer look into a single work from its collection in each volume; the second series, entitled “Arter Background”, reveals the thinking process behind each group exhibition; as well as singular books that focus on the exhibitions or artists featured in its programme.

In 2013, the exhibition book Aslı Çavuşoğlu: The Stones Talk, designed by Esen Karol, has been selected amongst the best 50 book designs at the 50 Books/50 Covers competition organised by AIGA and Design Observer. In 2014, the book of Füsun Onur's Through the Looking Glass exhibition, again designed by Esen Karol, has been included in the same selection. Designed by Ali Emre Doğramacı, the exhibition book Ali Mahmut Demirel: Isle has been awarded by the Turkish Graphic Designers Association (GMK) in the category of Best Book Cover Design in 2018.

In December 2021, Arter took a new step towards digital publishing with its first e-book, the Turkish edition of the Joseph Beuys monograph authored by Claudia Mesch.

List of publications:

 Starter, May 2010
 Second Exhibition Book 1/2, November 2010
 Second Exhibition Book 2/2, November 2010
 Tactics of Invisibility, April 2011
 Patricia Piccinini: Hold Me Close to Your Heart, June 2011
 Deniz Gül: 5 Person Bufet, July 2011
 Kutluğ Ataman: Mesopotamian Dramaturgies, September 2011
 Erdem Helvacıoğlu: Freedom to the Black, February 2012 
 Mona Hatoum: You Are Still Here, March 2012
 Nevin Aladağ: Stage, April 2012 
 Berlinde De Bruyckere: The Wound, June 2012
 Sophia Pompéry: The Silent Shape of Things, June 2012
 Adel Abidin, Rosa Barba, Runa Islam: The Move, October 2012
 Envy, Enmity, Embarrassment 1/2, January 2013
 Envy, Enmity, Embarrassment 2/2, January 2013
 Volkan Aslan: Don't Forget to Remember, May 2013
 Mat Collishaw: Afterimage, May 2013 
 Aslı Çavuşoğlu: The Stones Talk, November 2013
 Fatma Bucak: Yet Another Story About the Fall, November 2013
 Sarkis: Interpretation of Cage / Ryoanji, November 2013
 Marc Quinn: The Sleep of Reason, February 2014
 Füsun Onur: Through the Looking Glass, May 2014
 The Roving Eye: Contemporary Art from Southeast Asia, September 2014
 Ali Kazma: timemaker, January 2015
 Spaceliner, May 2015
 Šejla Kamerić: When the Heart Goes Bing Bam Boom, December 2015
 Bahar Yürükoğlu: Flow Through, March 2016
 Murat Akagündüz: Vertigo, March 2016
 Şener Özmen: Unfiltered, March 2016
 Not All That Falls Has Wings, June 2016
 Nil Yalter: Off the Record, October 2016
 Bilge Friedlaender: Words, Numbers, Lines, October 2016
 Jake & Dinos Chapman: In the Realm of the Senseless, February 2017
 Ways of Seeing, June 2017
 CANAN: Behind Mount Qaf, September 2017
 Can Aytekin: Empty House, March 2018
 Ali Mahmut Demirel: Isle, March 2018
 What Time Is It?, September 2019
 Words Are Very Unnecessary, September 2019
 Altan Gürman, September 2019
 İnci Furni: She Waited for a While, September 2019
 Ayşe Erkmen: Whitish, September 2019
 Sarkis: Çaylak Sokak, September 2019
KP Brehmer: Art ≠ Propaganda, June 2020
Cevdet Erek: Bergama Stereotip, September 2020
Alev Ebüzziya Siesbye: Repetition, November 2020
On Celestial Bodies, January 2021
Re: [aap_2019], January 2021
For Eyes That Listen, March 2021
David Tudor and Composers Inside Electronics, Inc. (John Driscoll and Phil Edelstein): Rainforest V (variation 3), April 2021
Arter: Sanat İçin Alan Yaratmak [Arter: Creating Space for Art], May 2021
Emre Hüner – [ELEKTROİZOLASYON]: Unknown Parameter Extro-Record, November 2021
Re: [aap_2020], November 2021
Joseph Beuys, December 2021 (The e-book is available in Turkish only)
Candeğer Furtun, February 2022
Bill Fontana: Resounding Io, May 2022
Locus Solus, June 2022
Canan Tolon: Loss, June 2022
Working Conditions: The Writings of Hans Haacke, July 2022 (The e-book is available in Turkish only)
Ahmet Doğu İpek: A Halo of Blackness Upon Our Heads, September 2022
Altan Gürman: Postcard Book, November 2022

Exhibitions

2023

Elina Brotherus, Large de Vue, 16 March–27 August 2023, Curator: Emre Baykal

Eva Koťátková, I Sometimes Imagine I Am a Fish with Legs, 2 March–27 August 2023, Curator: Eda Berkmen

Cengiz Çekil, I Am Still Alive, 9 February–24 September 2023, Curator: Eda Berkmen

2022

Bill Fontana, Silent Echoes: Notre-Dame, 13 September–4 December 2022

Rounded by Sleep, 19 May 2022 – 29 January 2023, Curator: Eda Berkmen, Artists: Ahu Akgün, Rasim Aksan, Alaettin Aksoy, Ann Antidote, Yüksel Arslan, Volkan Aslan, Ece Bal, Başak Bugay, Gökhan Deniz, Şükriye Dikmen, Marlene Dumas, Emine Ekinci, Annika Eriksson, İnci Furni, Nazmi Ziya Güran, İhsan Cemal Karaburçak, Gizem Karakaş, Evrim Kavcar, Merve Kılıçer, Eva Kotátková, Jarosław Kozłowski, Can Küçük, Nevhiz, Lara Ögel, Aslı Özdoyuran, İz Öztat, Necla Rüzgar, Pierrick Sorin, Mladen Stilinović, Etem Şahin, Ali Emir Tapan, Defne Tesal, Begüm Yamanlar

Ahmet Doğu İpek, A Halo of Blackness Upon Our Heads, 19 May 2022 – 29 January 2023, Curator: Selen Ansen

Locus Solus, 31 March – 31 December 2022, Curator: Selen Ansen, Artists: Murat Akagündüz, Jananne Al-Ani, Halil Altındere, Maddalena Ambrosio, Yüksel Arslan, Claus Böhmler, Xuefeng Chen, Tacita Dean, Osman Dinç, İnci Eviner, Thomas Geiger, Jytte Høy, Ahmet Doğu İpek, Eva Jospin, Ella Littwitz, Miklós Onucsán, Panamarenko, Sarkis, Yehudit Sasportas, Erinç Seymen, Bülent Şangar, Yaşam Şaşmazer, Cengiz Tekin, Endre Tót, Thu Van Tran, Mariana Vassileva, Werner Zellien

Bill Fontana, Resounding Io, 10 March – 4 December 2022, Curator: Melih Fereli

ThisPlay, 17 February 2022 – 9 April 2023, Curator: Emre Baykal, Artists: Gökçen Dilek Acay, Nevin Aladağ, Volkan Aslan, Selim Birsel, Barbara Bloom, Rada Boukova, Luchezar Boyadjiev, Claus Böhmler, Handan Börüteçene, George Brecht, Fatma Bucak, Jacob Dahlgren, Cevdet Erek, Ayşe Erkmen, Ceal Floyer, Hreinn Friðfinnsson, İnci Furni, Leylâ Gediz, Şakir Gökçebağ, Asta Gröting, Carla Guagliardi, Kristján Guðmundsson, Deniz Gül, Nilbar Güreş, Karl Horst Hödicke, Jytte Høy, Peter Hutchinson, IRWIN (Miran Mohar), Pravdoliub Ivanov, Rolf Julius, Žilvinas Kempinas, Gunilla Klingberg, Žolt Kovač, George Maciunas, Jonathan Monk, Sirous Namazi, Navid Nuur, Füsun Onur, Erkan Özgen, Serkan Özkaya, Ebru Özseçen, Michal Pěchouček, Goran Petercol, Sophia Pompéry, Anni Rapinoja, Dieter Roth, Sai (Chen Sai Hua Kuan), Karin Sander, Erinç Seymen, Hassan Sharif, Stuart Sherman, Viktor Takáč, Cengiz Tekin, Andrea Tippel, Kata Tranker, Gabriela Vanga, Mariana Vassileva, Stefan Wewerka, Maaria Wirkkala

2021

Candeğer Furtun, 16 September 2021 – 17 April 2022, Curator: Selen Ansen

Precaution, 3 June 2021 – 20 February 2022, Curator: Emre Baykal, Artists: Hamra Abbas, Halil Altındere, Rogelio López Cuenca, Burak Delier, Lamia Joreige, Ali Kazma, Alicja Kwade, Serkan Özkaya, Walid Raad, Canan Tolon, Nasan Tur

Füsun Onur, Opus II – Fantasia, 3 June 2021 – 20 February 2022, Curator: Emre Baykal

Emre Hüner, [ELEKTROİZOLASYON]: Unknown Parameter Extro-Record, 25 March 2021 – 31 December 2021, Curator: Aslı Seven

Nevin Aladağ, Traces, 25 March 2021 – 8 August 2021

2020

For Eyes That Listen, 10 September 2020 – 31 December 2021, Curator: Melih Fereli, Artists: Joseph Beuys, Barbara Bloom, John Cage, Henning Christiansen, Osman Dinç, John Driscoll, William Engelen, Hreinn Friðfinnsson, Dick Higgins, Július Koller, Jarosław Kozłowski, Hans Peter Kuhn, Füsun Onur, Nam June Paik, Lene Adler-Petersen, Annette Ruenzler, Carles Santos, Michael Snow

David Tudor and Composers Inside Electronics, Inc., Rainforest V (variation 3), 10 September 2020 – 6 February 2022, Curator: Melih Fereli

On Celestial Bodies, 10 September 2020 – 8 August 2021, Curator: Kevser Güler, Artists: Thomas Bayrle, Elina Brotherus, Annabel Daou, A K Dolven, Aleksandar Dimitrijević, Terry Fox, Naomi Wanjiku Gakunga, Ludwig Gosewitz, Shilpa Gupta, Nilbar Güreş, Altan Gürman, Asta Gröting, Gülsün Karamustafa, Suchan Kinoshita, Milan Knížák, Igor Kopystiansky, Alicja Kwade, Nicholas Mangan, Vlado Martek, Aydan Murtezaoğlu, Alice Nikitinová, Füsun Onur, Fernando Ortega, Serkan Özkaya, Ebru Özseçen, Karin Sander, Monika Sosnowska, Mariana Vassileva

KP Brehmer, The Big Picture, 10 September 2020 – 21 March 2021, Curator: Selen Ansen

Alev Ebüzziya Siesbye, Repetition, 10 September 2020 – 7 March 2021, Curator: Eda Berkmen

Cevdet Erek, Bergama Stereotip, 27 February – 3 January 2021, Curator: Selen Ansen

2019

What Time Is It?, 13 September 2019 – 26 July 2020, Curators: Emre Baykal & Eda Berkmen, Artists: Mac Adams, Hüseyin Bahri Alptekin, Volkan Aslan, Marie Cool Fabio Balducci, Aslı Çavuşoğlu, Cengiz Çekil, Barış Doğrusöz, Cevdet Erek, Ayşe Erkmen, Harun Farocki, Hreinn Friðfinnsson, Bilge Friedlaender, Deniz Gül, Al Hansen, Mona Hatoum, Eric Hattan, Vlatka Horvat, Ahmet Doğu İpek, Alicja Kwade, Gülsün Karamustafa, Sinan Logie, Jonas Mekas, Füsun Onur, İz Öztat, Nam June Paik, Seza Paker, Sigmar Polke, Reiner Ruthenbeck, Michael Sailstorfer, Sarkis, Serge Spitzer, Hale Tenger, Nil Yalter

Words Are Very Unnecessary, 13 September 2019 – 26 July 2020, Curator: Selen Ansen, Artists: Gökçen Dilek Acay, Vito Acconci, Nevin Aladağ, Meriç Algün, Francis Alÿs, Yto Barrada, Mehtap Baydu, Joseph Beuys, Geta Brătescu, George Brecht, Elina Brotherus, Stanley Brouwn, Sophie Calle, Anetta Mona Chişa, Lucia Tkáčová, Henning Christiansen, Elmas Deniz, Elisabetta Di Maggio, Osman Dinç, Didem Erk, Ceal Floyer, Leylâ Gediz, Ludwig Gosewitz, Rebecca Horn, Vlatka Horvat, Allan Kaprow, Ali Kazma, Milan Knížák, Daniel Knorr, Július Koller, Igor Kopystiansky, Alicja Kwade, Lene Adler Petersen, Sigmar Polke, Karin Sander, Sarkis, Roman Signer, Amikam Toren, Ken Unsworth, Franz Erhard Walther, Anne Wenzel, Akram Zaatari

Altan Gürman, 13 September 2019 – 9 February 2020, Curator: Başak Doğa Temür

İnci Furni, She Waited for a While, 13 September 2019 – 23 February 2020, Curator: Eda Berkmen

Ayşe Erkmen, Whitish, 13 September 2019 – 26 July 2020, Curator: Emre Baykal

Rosa Barba,The Hidden Conference, 13 September 2019 – 2 February 2020, Curator: Başak Doğa Temür

Céleste Bousier Mougenot, offroad, v.2, 13 September – 15 December 2019, Curator: Selen Ansen

2018

Ali Mahmut Demirel, Isle, 16 March – 15 July 2018, Curator: Başak Doğa Temür

Can Aytekin, Empty House, 16 March – 15 July 2018, Curator: Eda Berkmen

2017

Jake & Dinos Chapman, In the Realm of the Senseless, 10 February – 7 May 2017, Curator: Nick Hackworth

CANAN, Behind Mount Qaf, 12 September 2017 – 18 February 2018, Curator: Nazlı Gürlek

Ways of Seeing, 2 June 2017 – 13 August 2017, Curators: Sam Bardaouil & Till Fellrath, Artists: Ghada Amer, Chris Bond, Cantagalli, David Claerbout, Jojakim Cortis & Adrian Sonderegger, Hayri Çizel, Salvador Dali, Hans-Peter Feldmann, Andreas Gursky, Mona Hatoum, Jeppe Hein, Paul & Marlene Kos, Alicja Kwade, Gustav Metzger, Shana Moulton, Vik Muniz, Grayson Perry, Walid Raad, Edouard Frederic Wilhelm Richter, Fred Sandback, Markus Schinwald, Hassan Sharif, Cindy Sherman, Kim Tschang-Yeul, James Turrell, Kara Walker, James Webb, Frederik de Wit

2016

Bilge Friedlaender, Words, Numbers, Lines, 14 October 2016 – 15 January 2017, Curators: Mira Friedlaender & Işın Önol

Nil Yalter, Off the Record, 14 October 2016 – 15 January 2017, Curator: Eda Berkmen

Not All That Falls Has Wings, 9 June–18 September 2016, Curator: Selen Ansen, Artists: Bas Jan Ader, Phyllida Barlow, Cyprien Gaillard, Ryan Gander, Mikhail Karikis, Uriel Orlow, VOID, Anne Wenzel

Bahar Yürükoğlu, Flow Through, 30 March – 15 May 2016, Curator: Duygu Demir

Murat Akagündüz, Vertigo, 30 March – 15 May 2016, Curator: Aslı Seven

Şener Özmen, Unfiltered, 30 March – 15 May 2016, Curator: Süreyyya Evren

2015

Šejla Kamerić, When the Heart Goes Bing Bam Boom, 11 December 2015 – 28 February 2016, Curator: Başak Doğa Temür

Spaceliner, 15 May – 2 August 2015, Curator: Barbara Heinrich, Artists: Peter Anders, Sandra Boeschenstein, Pip Culbert, İnci Eviner, Monika Grzymala, Nic Hess, Gözde İlkin, Harry Kramer, Pauline Kraneis, Hans Peter Kuhn, Zilla Leutenegger, Pia Linz, Christiane Löhr, Ulrike Mohr, Jong Oh, Nadja Schöllhammer, Heike Weber

Ali Kazma, timemaker, 30 January – 5 April 2015, Curator: Emre Baykal

2014

The Roving Eye - Contemporary Art from Southeast Asia, 18 September 2014 – 4 January 2015, Curator: Iola Lenzi, Artists: Alwin Reamillo, Araya Rasdjarmrearnsook, Aung Ko, Aung Myint, Bui Cong Khanh, Chris Chong Chan Fui, Dinh Q. Lê, Duto Hardono, FX Harsono, Heri Dono, Isabel & Alfredo Aquilizan, Ise Roslisham, Jakkai Siributr, Jason Lim, Josephine Turalba, Krisna Murti, Lee Wen, Luong Hue Trinh & Nguyen Xuan Son, Manit Sriwanichpoom, Melati Suryodarmo, Mella Jaarsma, Michael Shaowanasai, Nguyen Van Cuong, Restu Ratnaningtyas, Srey Bandaul, Sutee Kunavichayanont, Tawatchai Puntusawasdi, Tay Wei Leng, Vasan Sitthiket, Vertical Submarine, Vu Dan Tan, Yee I-Lann

Füsun Onur, Through the Looking Glass, 28 May – 17 August 2014, Curator: Emre Baykal

Marc Quinn, The Sleep of Reason, 8 February – 27 April 2014, Curator: Selen Ansen

2013

Aslı Çavuşoğlu, The Stones Talk, 15 November 2013 – 12 January 2014, Curator: Özge Ersoy

Fatma Bucak, Yet Another Story About the Fall, 15 November 2013 – 12 January 2014, Curator: Başak Doğa Temür

Sarkis, Interpretation of Cage / Ryoanji, 15 November 2013 – 12 January 2014, Curator: Melih Fereli

Mat Collishaw, Afterimage, 2 May – 11 August 2013, Curator: Başak Doğa Temür

Volkan Aslan, Don’t Forget to Remember, 2 May – 11 August 2013, Curator: Emre Baykal

Envy, Enmity, Embarrassment, 24 January – 7 April 2013, Curator: Emre Baykal, Artists: Selim Birsel, Hera Büyüktaşçıyan, CANAN, Aslı Çavuşoğlu, Merve Ertufan & Johanna Adebäck, Nilbar Güreş, Berat Işık, Şener Özmen, Yusuf Sevinçli, Erdem Taşdelen, Hale Tenger, Mahir Yavuz

2012

Adel Abidin, Rosa Barba, Runa Islam, The Move, 5 October – 18 November 2012, Curator: Başak Şenova

Sophia Pompéry, The Silent Shape of Things, 21 June – 26 August 2012, Curator: Ece Pazarbaşı

Berlinde De Bruyckere, The Wound, 21 June – 26 August 2012, Curator: Selen Ansen

Nevin Aladağ, Stage, 6 April – 27 May 2012, Curator: Başak Doğa Temür

Mona Hatoum, You Are Still Here, 17 March – 27 May 2012, Curator: Emre Baykal

Erdem Helvacıoğlu, Freedom to the Black, 10 – 26 February 2012, Curator: Melih Fereli

2011

Kutluğ Ataman, Mesopotamian Dramaturgies, 15 September – 11 December 2011, Curator: Emre Baykal

Deniz Gül, 5 Person Bufet, 8 July – 25 September 2011, Curator: Emre Baykal

Patricia Piccinini, Hold Me Close to Your Heart, 22 June – 21 August 2011, Curator: Başak Doğa Temür

Tactics of Invisibility, 9 April – 5 June 2011, Curators: Daniela Zyman, Emre Baykal, Artists: Nevin Aladağ, Kutluğ Ataman, Cevdet Erek, Ayşe Erkmen, Esra Ersen, İnci Eviner, Nilbar Güreş, Hafriyat, Ali Kazma, Füsun Onur, Sarkis, Hale Tenger, Nasan Tur, xurban_collective

2010

Second Exhibition, 28 November 2010 – 13 March 2011, Curator: Emre Baykal, Artists: .-_-., Halil Altındere, Burak Arıkan, Volkan Aslan, Vahap Avşar, Banu Cennetoğlu – Yasemin Özcan Kaya, Ayşe Erkmen, Hafriyat (Murat Akagündüz, Antonio Cosentino, extramücadele, İnci Furni, Mustafa Pancar), Ali Kazma, Aydan Murtezaoğlu – Bülent Şangar, Ahmet Öğüt, İz Öztat, Cengiz Tekin, Canan Tolon

Starter - Works from the Vehbi Koç Foundation Contemporary Art Collection, 8 May – 31 October 2010, Curator: René Block, Artists: Adel Abidin, Lene Adler Petersen, Nevin Aladağ, Halil Altındere, Lauri Astala, Fikret Atay, Ay-O, Maja Bajević, Joseph Beuys, Barbara Bloom, Claus Böhmler, George Brecht, KP Brehmer, Elina Brotherus, Stanley Brouwn, John Cage, Sophie Calle, Mircea Cantor, Olga Chernysheva, Giuseppe Chiari, Anetta Mona Chişa & Lucia Tkáčová, Henning Christiansen, John Coplans, Cengiz Çekil, Braco Dimitrijević, Maria Eichhorn, Cevdet Erek, Ayşe Erkmen, Harun Farocki, Robert Filliou, Terry Fox, Dan Graham, Asta Gröting, Nilbar Güreş, Kristján Gudmundsson, Richard Hamilton, Al Hansen, Dick Higgins, Rebecca Horn, K.H. Hödicke, Joe Jones, Ilya & Emilia Kabakov, Šejla Kamerić, Aino Kannisto, Allan Kaprow, Gülsün Karamustafa, Diána Keller, William Kentridge, Alison Knowles, Servet Koçyiğit, Julius Koller, Jarosław Kozłowski, Arthur Köpcke, Konrad Lueg, George Maciunas, Walter Marchetti, Olaf Metzel, Mandana Moghaddam, Aydan Murtezaoğlu, Zoran Naskovski, Navid Nuur, Miklos Onucsan, Ahmet Öğüt, Erkan Özgen, Ebru Özseçen, Nam June Paik, Dan Perjovschi, Goran Petercol, Sigmar Polke, Sophia Pompéry, Diter Rot, Annette Ruenzler, Reiner Ruthenbeck, Michael Sailstorfer, Karin Sander, Carles Santos, Stuart Sherman, Serge Spitzer, Superflex, Bülent Şangar, Cengiz Tekin, Endre Tót, Nasan Tur, Ben Vautier, Wolf Vostell, Emmett Williams, Maaria Wirkkala

References

External links
 Official Website
 Vehbi Koç Foundation Website

2010 establishments in Turkey
Art galleries established in 2010